Nikola Šipčić (born 17 May 1995) is a Montenegrin footballer who plays as a defender for Spanish club CD Tenerife. Born in Serbia, Šipčić plays for the Montenegro national team.

Club career

Early career
Born in Priboj, Šipčić started his career at the local club FAP. Playing as a senior, Šipčić appeared in the Drina Zone League as a bonus player until the end of 2013, when he left the club. At the beginning of 2014, Šipčić joined Serbian SuperLiga side OFK Beograd and passed the winter break off-season with the first team. After the end of 2013–14 Serbian SuperLiga season, when he overgrown youth selection, Šipčić left the club without official caps.

Rad
In summer 2014, Šipčić joined Rad reserves, Žarkovo. He stayed with the club for two seasons, scoring three goals on 46 matches in the Serbian League Belgrade. In summer 2016, Šipčić promoted in the first team and signed a three-year professional contract with Rad. He made his SuperLiga for Rad in 18 fixture match of the 2016–17 Serbian SuperLiga season against Radnički Niš, replacing injured Stevan Bates. Previously, he made an official debut for the club in a Serbian Cup match against Mladost Lučani, played on 26 October 2016. Through the first season in professional football, Šipčić made 4 competitive matches at total. During the 2017–18 Serbian SuperLiga campaign, Šipčić was also a part of the first squad under coaches Gordan Petrić, Slađan Nikolić and Zoran Milinković, making 25 appearances in both domestic competitions. In summer 2018, Šipčić extended his contract with Rad on a three-year deal until June 2021. Šipčić noted his first goal for Rad in 3rd fixture match of the 2018–19 Serbian SuperLiga campaign, scoring in 2–1 away victory over Vojvodina on 5 August 2018.

Tenerife
On 30 July 2019, Šipčić moved abroad and signed a three-year deal with Spanish Segunda División side CD Tenerife.

International career
Born in Serbia, Šipčić is of Montenegrin descent. He was called up to represent the Montenegro national team for a set of friendlies in March 2022. On 24 March 2022, he debuted with Montenegro in a 1–0 friendly loss to Armenia on 24 March 2022.

Career statistics

Club

References

External links
 
 
 

1995 births
Living people
People from Priboj
Montenegrin footballers
Montenegro international footballers
Serbian footballers
Serbian people of Montenegrin descent
Association football defenders
FK FAP players
OFK Beograd players
FK Rad players
Serbian SuperLiga players
CD Tenerife players
Montenegrin expatriate footballers
Montenegrin expatriate sportspeople in Spain
Serbian expatriate footballers
Serbian expatriate sportspeople in Spain
Expatriate footballers in Spain